Barauli Assembly constituency is an assembly constituency in Gopalganj district in the Indian state of Bihar.

Overview
In the district and a part of the Lok Sabha (parliamentary) constituency named Gopalganj, Barauli is a legislative assembly constituency of Bihar. The Barauli assembly segment is populated by 2,39,638 people who hold the adult franchise to vote in the constituency. There are 1,26,458 male and 1,13,177 female electors in the constituency. 
As per Delimitation of Parliamentary and Assembly constituencies Order, 2008, No. 100 Barauli Assembly constituency is composed of the following: Manjha community development block; Mohadipur Pakaria, Dewapur, Sonbarsa, Batardeh, Sarfara, Nawada Chand, Kahla, Moghal Biraicha, Kalyanpur, Sarean Narendra, Belsand, Madhopur, Mahammadpur Nilami, Bagheji, Bishunpura, Larauli  gram panchayats and Barauli (NA) of Barauli CD Block.

Barauli Assembly constituency is part of No. 17 Gopalganj (Lok Sabha constituency) (SC).

Members  of Legislative Assembly

Election results

2020

References

External links
 

Assembly constituencies of Bihar
Politics of Gopalganj district, India